Charbakh may refer to several things related to Yerevan, Armenia:

Nerkin Charbakh, a neighborhood
Verin Charbakh, a neighborhood
Charbakh (Yerevan Metro), a railway station
Charbakh Yerevan Futsal Club